Miller Township is an inactive township in Marion County, in the U.S. state of Missouri.

Miller Township was established in 1847, and named after Samuel Miller, a pioneer citizen.

References

Townships in Missouri
Townships in Marion County, Missouri